This is a list of parks and open spaces in the ceremonial county of Cheshire. It includes urban parks, country parks, woodlands, commons, lakes, walking trails, local nature reserves and other green spaces that are open to the public. Small neighbourhood parks and pocket parks are not included.

Parks and open spaces in Cheshire



See also

List of Sites of Special Scientific Interest in Cheshire
Recreational walks in Cheshire

References

Parks and open spaces in Cheshire